2nd Central Committee may refer to:
Central Committee of the 2nd Congress of the Russian Social Democratic Labour Party, 1903–1905
2nd Central Committee of the Bulgarian Communist Party, 1920–1921
2nd Central Executive Committee of the Chinese Communist Party, 1922–1923
2nd Central Committee of the Communist Party of Cuba, 1980–1986
2nd Central Committee of the Socialist Unity Party of Germany, 1947–1950
2nd Central Committee of the Polish United Workers' Party, 1954–1959
2nd Central Committee of the Romanian Communist Party, 1922–1924
2nd Central Committee of the Lao People's Revolutionary Party, 1972–1982
2nd Central Committee of the Workers' Party of Vietnam, 1951–1960
2nd Central Committee of the Communist Party of Yugoslavia, 1920–1926
2nd Central Committee of the Communist Party of Hungary, 1930–1946
2nd Central Committee of the Workers' Party of Korea, 1948–1956